Five Anxious Days (German: Fünf bange Tage) is a 1928 German silent film directed by Gennaro Righelli and starring Maria Jacobini, Anton Pointner and Nathalie Lissenko.

The film's sets were designed by the art directors Otto Erdmann and Hans Sohnle.

Cast
 Maria Jacobini as Maria Voikoff  
 Anton Pointner as Ihr Mann Wladimir Voikoff 
Nathalie Lissenko as Seine Mutter  
 Gabriel Gabrio as General Vorileff  
 Fritz Alberti as Fürst Kierowski  
 Harry Hardt as Sein Adjutant  
 Angelo Ferrari as Ivan Petrovich

References

Bibliography
 James Robert Parish. Film Actors Guide. Scarecrow Press, 1977.

External links

1928 films
Films of the Weimar Republic
German silent feature films
Films directed by Gennaro Righelli
German black-and-white films
Films set in the Russian Empire